The Prague Classic is an annual tournament on the men's World Curling Tour. It is held annually in November at the Curling Aréna Praha Roztyly in Prague, Czech Republic.  

The purse for the event is €13,500, with the winning team receiving €4,500.

The event has been held since 2018.

Men's champions

References

World Curling Tour events
Curling competitions in the Czech Republic
Sports competitions in Prague